The Chli Aubrig (1,642 m) is a mountain of the Swiss Prealps, located between Euthal and Vorderthal in the canton of Schwyz. It lies west of the higher Gross Aubrig.

References

External links
Chli Aubrig on Hikr

Mountains of the Alps
Mountains of the canton of Schwyz
Mountains of Switzerland